Senator Browne may refer to:

Members of the Irish Senate
Edward Browne (Irish politician) (fl. 1960s), Irish Senator from 1960 to 1961
Fad Browne (1906–1991), Irish Senator from 1973 to 1977
John Browne (Fine Gael politician) (1936–2019) Irish Senator from 1983 to 1987
Kathleen Browne (1876–1943), Irish Senator from 1929 to 1936
Noël Browne (1915–1997), Irish Senator from 1973 to 1977

Members of the Northern Irish Senate
Gerald Browne (politician) (1871/1872–1951), Northern Irish Senator from 1942 to 1951

United States state senate members
Edward E. Browne (1868–1945), Wisconsin State Senate
Edward L. Browne (1830–1925), Wisconsin State Senate
Jefferson B. Browne (1857–1937), Florida State Senate
Pat Browne (born 1963), Pennsylvania State Senate
Thomas M. Browne (1829–1891), Indiana State Senate

Other
Noel Crichton-Browne (born 1944), Senate of Australia

See also
Senator Brown (disambiguation)